Peter Jay may refer to:

Peter Jay (diplomat) (born 1937), English economist, broadcaster, and diplomat
Peter Jay, founder in 1968 of independent UK poetry publishing company Anvil Press
Peter Jay, drummer of Peter Jay and the Jaywalkers

See also
Peter Augustus Jay (disambiguation)
Peter Jay Sharp Theater (disambiguation)
1838 Peter Augustus Jay House, named for Peter A. Jay